Enandio is a village in the Juárez Municipality of Michoacán, Mexico, two miles before arriving at Los Laureles, Michoacán (Benito Juarez).

Populated places in Michoacán